Broder or Bröder is a surname. Notable people with the surname Broder / Bröder include:
Andrei Broder (born 1953), Research Fellow and Vice President of Emerging Search Technology for Yahoo!
Andrew Broder (1845–1918), Ontario farmer and merchant, member of the Canadian House of Commons from 1896 to 1911
Annie Glen Broder (1857–1937), Canadian musician
Berl Broder (1817–1868), Ukrainian Jew and the most famous of the Broder singers
David S. Broder (1929–2011), Pulitzer Prize-winning journalist, columnist for The Washington Post, and professor at the University of Maryland
Gavin Broder (born 1959), former chief Rabbi of Ireland
Henryk Broder (born 1946), German journalist, columnist for the daily newspaper Die Welt
Melissa Broder (born 1979), poet and writer
Mirko Bröder (1911–1943), Hungarian–Serbian chess master
Samuel Broder, co-developer of anti AIDS drugs and former Director of the National Cancer Institute

See also
Broda (disambiguation)
Broder singer

Jewish surnames